Ptychopseustis ictericalis is a moth in the family Crambidae first described by Charles Swinhoe in 1886. It is found in India and Saudi Arabia.

References

Cybalomiinae
Moths described in 1886